Tibor Peter Nagy Jr. (born April 29, 1949) is a former United States Assistant Secretary of State for African Affairs, and a former American foreign service officer who served as the American ambassador to Guinea and to Ethiopia.

Early life and education 
As a child, Nagy was forced to flee from Hungary and arrived in Washington DC in 1957, which became his home. After retiring from the Foreign Service, Nagy served as Vice Provost for International Affairs at Texas Tech University, from which he graduated in 1972. He also received a master's degree from the George Washington University in 1978.

Career 

Nagy is a retired career U.S. Foreign Service officer who followed through assignments as US Ambassador to Ethiopia and Guinea as well as the Deputy Chief of Mission in Nigeria, Cameroon and Togo. His earlier assignments included Zambia, the Seychelles, Ethiopia, and Washington, DC.

Nagy was nominated to the position of Assistant Secretary of State for African Affairs by President Donald Trump on May 10, 2018. He testified before the U.S. Senate Foreign Relations Committee on June 14 and was confirmed by a voice vote of the full Senate on June 28. Nagy assumed office on July 23, 2018. He was succeeded by Robert F. Godec.

Personal life 
Nagy has been married to Jane since 1971. They have three adult children who were the first triplets born in the independent Zimbabwe.

Publications 
The 2014 Paris Book Festival awarded the winning prize in non-fiction to "Kiss Your Latte Goodbye: Managing Overseas Operations" which was co-authored by Nagy.

References

External links

1949 births
Living people
People from Budapest
Texas Tech University alumni
George Washington University alumni
Ambassadors of the United States to Ethiopia
Ambassadors of the United States to Guinea
Texas Tech University faculty
Hungarian emigrants to the United States
United States Foreign Service personnel
Assistant Secretaries of State for African Affairs
Trump administration personnel
20th-century American diplomats
21st-century American diplomats